The Hul Jharkhand Party was a political party in India. It was founded by Justin Richard on 28 December 1968, after the fragmentation of the Jharkhand Party. The party worked amongst the Santhal populations. It demanded a separate tribal-majority state and social reform. A splinter group, the Bihar Progressive Hul Jharkhand Party was later founded by Sibu Soren.

Political parties in Jharkhand
Political parties established in 1968
Political schisms
1968 establishments in Bihar